Wabbit is a 1982 video game by Apollo for the Atari 2600. The game is reported to be the "first console game with a named playable female character who isn't off-screen".

Gameplay

Wabbit is a farming simulation game with elements of the shoot 'em up genre in which the player controls a female character named "Billie Sue". Rabbits have descended upon Sue's farm and are quickly devouring her crop of carrots. In order to ward off the rabbits, the player must throw rotten eggs at them before they are able to carry away Sue's carrots. The player scores points by hitting rabbits, and the rabbits score points by carrying carrots off-screen. As the player's score increases, the rabbits move progressively faster. The game ends when either the player scores 1300 points or the rabbits' score reaches 100; whenever the player's score reaches a multiple of 100, the rabbits' score is lowered.

Development
In the early 1980s, Apollo received a number of letters from fans suggesting potential games they could develop. Coincidentally, two such letters simultaneously proposed the idea of having a farmer defend a farm from rabbits. Apollo had recently hired Van Mai (then Van Tran), a programmer originally from Vietnam who had done work with computer graphics for the Dallas Independent School District but was new to the video games industry. While the letters had the player assume the role of a male protagonist, she proposed creating a game aimed at girls featuring a female character instead, named Billie Sue. The proposal was accepted, and Tran designed and created the game as the sole developer on the project. Development took four to six months. It was showcased at the Texas State Fair in October 1982 around the time of release.

Reception
Video game historian Kevin Bunch describes Wabbit as "colorful" and "probably one of the best games [Apollo] put out." One modern critic likewise praised the game's graphics as "refreshing" for its time, though criticizing the gameplay as frustrating, particularly as the speed of the rabbits increased.

Legacy
The game is reported to be the "first console game with a named playable female character who isn't off-screen".

For decades, efforts have been made to contact the programmer, whose name was reported by former coworkers as "Ban Tran". Her actual name was discovered in 2022, and she was interviewed by the Video Game History Foundation in the following May. Wabbit was the only game Tran developed for Apollo, as the company declared bankruptcy in November 1982; she later worked on a port of Solar Fox for the Atari 5200 for MicroGraphic Image, before leaving the video game industry.

References

External links
Wabbit at Atari Mania

1982 video games
Action video games
Farming video games
Atari 2600 games
Atari 2600-only games
Video games about rabbits and hares
Video games developed in the United States
Video games featuring female protagonists